The 2013 Cyprus Women's Cup was the sixth edition of the Cyprus Women's Cup, an invitational women's football tournament held annually in Cyprus. It took place between 3–14 March 2013.

Defending champions France cancelled their participation just after the UEFA Women's Euro 2013 draw, because of too many European opponents in the tournament. The tournament was won by England.

Format
The twelve invited teams are split into three groups that played a round-robin tournament.

Groups A and B, containing the strongest ranked teams, are the only ones in contention to win the title. The group winners from A and B contested the final, with the runners-up playing for third place. The Group C winner faced the better third place team from Groups A and B for fifth, with the Group C runner-up facing the other third place team for seventh. Group C's third place team faced the better fourth place team of Groups A and B, while the other two fourth place teams play in the 11th place match.

Points awarded in the group stage followed the standard formula of three points for a win, one point for a draw and zero points for a loss. In the case of two teams being tied on the same number of points in a group, their head-to-head result determined the higher place.

Venues
The games were played in 3 host stadiums in 3 cities.

Teams
Listed are the confirmed teams.

The only debutant is the Republic of Ireland.

Group stage

Group A

Group B

Group C

Knockout stage

Eleventh place match

Ninth place match

Seventh place match

Fifth place match

Third place match

Final

Champion

Goalscorers
3 goals
 Ellen White
 Sanna Talonen

2 goals

 Christine Sinclair
 Toni Duggan
 Elisa Camporese
 Amber Hearn
 Hannah Wilkinson
 Kim Little
 Jane Ross
 Ji So-yun
 Ramona Bachmann

1 goal

 Jonelle Filigno
 Diana Matheson
 Sophie Schmidt
 Eniola Aluko
 Jessica Clarke
 Steph Houghton
 Jordan Nobbs
 Kelly Smith
 Rachel Williams
 Rachel Yankey
 Emmi Alanen
 Maija Saari
 Barbara Bonansea
 Sara Gama
 Daniëlle van de Donk
 Lieke Martens
 Anna Green
 Betsy Hassett
 Alana McShane
 Julie Nelson
 Lynda Shepherd
 Diane Caldwell
 Megan Campbell
 Ruesha Littlejohn
 Áine O'Gorman
 Louise Quinn
 Shannon Smyth
 Lisa Evans
 Rhonda Jones
 Emma Mitchell
 Robyn Moodaly
 Jermaine Seoposenwe
 Nocane Skiti
 Lee Geum-min
 Lee Eun-mi
 Kim Sang-eun
 Vanessa Bernauer
 Ana-Maria Crnogorčević
 Lara Dickenmann

References

External links

Tournament at soccerway.com

2013
2013 in women's association football
Women